Makowiec  is a village in the administrative district of Gmina Skaryszew, within Radom County, Masovian Voivodeship, in east-central Poland.

The village has a population of 900.

References

Makowiec